Badminton at the 2024 Summer Paralympics in Paris, France will be played at the Porte de La Chapelle Arena from 29 August to 2 September. There will be sixteen events taking place, two more events than the previous Games: seven events for men and women (six singles, one doubles) and two mixed doubles events.

Classification
There will be six different classes in competition.
WH1: Athletes who have impairment in both lower limbs and trunk and/or have high spinal cord injuries. They may also have impaired hand function which could impact the ability to manoeuvre in their wheelchair. Their playing style is by holding their wheelchair with one hand while the other hand is moving the racquet; they will push or pull themselves to a neutral wheelchair sitting position after the stroke.
WH2: Similar to WH1 athletes, WH2 athletes have one or more impairments in their lower limbs, one or more loss of legs (above the knee) and would have minimal or no trunk impairment and/or lower. They would move their wheelchairs quicker than WH1 athletes and they will hold onto their wheels less to maintain their balance.
SL3: Athletes would have impairment in one or both lower limbs and have poor walking/running balance: to reduce their impairment, they would often compete on half-court (lengthwise). These athletes would have cerebral palsy, bilateral polio or loss of both legs below the knee.
SL4: Athletes would run faster and have better balance than athletes who are in the SL3 class, they would have an impairment in one or both lower limbs, unilateral polio or mild cerebral palsy. These athletes would play on full-court.
SU5: Unlike the SL3 and SL4 sport classes, SU5 have impairment in their upper limbs such as a missing thumb which restricts grip and power of the stroke or loss of an arm due to amputation or nerve damage. Also, athletes may have a severe impairment to their non-playing arm which can affect balance movements, trunk rotation and ability to serve.
SH6: Athletes who have achondroplasia and short stature.

Qualification

Ranking period starts from January 2023 and ends in March 2024.

Medal table

Medalists

Singles

Doubles

See also
Badminton at the 2024 Summer Olympics

References

2024 Summer Paralympics events
Badminton tournaments in France
Para-badminton
Badminton at the Summer Paralympics